Abba Mordechai Berman (1919–2005) was a Talmudist and rosh yeshiva of Yeshivas Iyun HaTalmud.

Early life 
Abba Berman was born on Tu BiShvat 5679 (1919) in Łódź, Poland to Shaul Yosef Berman, rosh yeshiva of Toras Chesed in Lodz and a student of the Chofetz Chayim. As a young child, Berman's greatness was recognized by the Chofetz Chaim. The Berman family were descendants of Shlomo Ephraim Luntschitz.

Following his Bar Mitzvah, Berman learned in Yeshivas Mir where he became close to the mashgiach ruchani, Yerucham Levovitz. Upon his arrival, the other students gave Berman the nickname "Abba Einstein" in recognition of his brilliance. The name stuck so well that Chaim Shmuelevitz, acknowledging this comparison, remarked "A bochur (young man) has arrived with such an interesting name... Einstein..." Aryeh Finkel quoted Shmuelevitz as saying "They have Einstein, but we have Abba Lodzer!" Berman particularly impressed Eliezer Yehuda Finkel with his novellae on Kodashim. He was a study partner of Nachum Partzovitz.

World War II 
Along with most of the student body of the Yeshivas Mir, Berman fled to Shanghai during World War II. Between sedorim (study sessions) in Shanghai he managed to obtain the only copy of Chaim Soloveitchik's chiddushim on the Rambam that was in the yeshiva. Cutting down on the time he spent at meals, he toiled over Reb Chaim instead until he'd finished the entire sefer (book). Thereafter he saw himself as a student of Soloveitchik and modeled the way he learned upon his approach.

New York City 
Berman eventually migrated to the United States where he became one of the founding members of the Mir Yeshiva in Brooklyn, where he married Itka Greenberg. Berman established Yeshivas Iyun HaTalmud on Beach 17th Street in Far Rockaway, Queens.

Land of Israel 
After several years, Berman emigrated to Israel and re-established  Yeshivas Iyun HaTalmud in Bnai Brak. The yeshiva relocated to Jerusalem, then finally to the Israeli settlement of Kiryat Sefer in the West Bank. In his final years he served as rosh yeshiva of Yeshivas Knesses Yitzchok of Chadera-Kiryat Sefer.

Death 
He died on May 12, 2005 corresponding to the 3rd of Iyar, 5765. His Talmudic lectures were published posthumously under the title "Iyun HaTalmud" (עיון התלמוד).

Berman was survived by his wife and six daughters. His wife died at the end of Cheshvan, 5770. One of his daughters, Mrs. Ornstein, runs the Hadar Seminary for Women in Jerusalem, where two of Berman's other daughters also teach. One of those was married to Mosheh Twersky, the elder son of Yitzhak Twersky of Boston, and a grandson of Joseph B. Soloveitchik, who taught at Yeshivas Toras Moshe and was murdered in the 2014 Jerusalem synagogue attack.

Legacy 
Berman was recognized as a gadol (prominent rabbi) despite never having accepted a significant leadership post.. He is supposed to have coined the idiom, "“From your viewpoint, you’re right. It’s your viewpoint that’s wrong.”

Notable students 
 Chaim Malinowitz (1952 – 2019), rabbi in Ramat Beit Shemesh and editor of the Schottenstein Edition of the Babylonian Talmud
 Yerucham Olshin, rosh yeshiva in Beth Medrash Govoha
 Yisroel Eliyahu Weintraub, kabbalist

Publications 
Shiurei Iyun HaTalmud, on Seder Kodshim
Shiurei Iyun HaTalmud, on Seder Nashim

External links 
 Shiurim of Rabbi Abba Berman
 Extended Obituary of Rabbi Abba Berman

References 

1919 births
2005 deaths
20th-century rabbis in Jerusalem
American Haredi rabbis
Haredi rabbis in Israel
Israeli settlers
Clergy from Łódź
20th-century Polish rabbis
Polish Haredi rabbis
Polish emigrants to Israel
Rosh yeshivas
Mir Yeshiva alumni